Governor Perry may refer to:

Benjamin Franklin Perry (1805–1886), 72nd Governor of South Carolina
Edward A. Perry (1831–1889), 14th Governor of Florida
Madison S. Perry (1814–1865), 4th Governor of Florida
Rick Perry (born 1950), 47th Governor of Texas